is the major railway station in the city of Sasebo, Nagasaki Prefecture, in Japan. The Sasebo Line of the Kyushu Railway Company and the Nishi-Kyūshū Line of the Matsuura Railway provide local and regional service and connections to the extensive JR network. Sasebo is the westernmost station in the JR Group.

The plaza in front of Sasebo Station contains a multi-level shopping complex called Friesta Sasebo, with coffee shops, clothing, housewares, music and a supermarket. Within the station itself are souvenir shops featuring local foods and products.

Sasebo Station is about two hours by train from Hakata Station in the city of Fukuoka (via the Midori line) and about two hours from Nagasaki Station in the city of Nagasaki.

Across the street from Sasebo Station is the Sasebo Bus Center, which provides connecting service to many local destinations.

Lines
JR Kyushu
Sasebo Line
Matsuura Railway
Nishi-Kyūshū Line

Station layout

JR
The station is above ground level with 3 platforms and 6 tracks.

MR
The Matsuura station is above ground level with 1 platform and 2 tracks.

Surroundings

East
Ekimachi Ichōme Sasebo
Hotel Resol Sasebo
Sasebo Station Post Office
Sasebo Bus Center
National Route 35

Port
Shin-Minato Terminal
Kujirase Terminal
Sasebo Gobangai

History
January 20, 1898 - Open for business by Kyushu Railway. 
July 1, 1907 - Railways nationalize and the station becomes part of Japanese Government Railways.
April 1, 1987 - Railways privatize and the station is inherited by JR Kyushu.
April 1, 1988 - JR Kyushu Matsuura Line inherited by Matsuura Railway and renamed Nishi-Kyushu Line.
December 26, 2001 - Elevated station is completed.

Adjacent stations

Passenger statistics
In fiscal 2016, the station was used by an average of 3,973 passengers daily (boarding passengers only), and it ranked 51st  among the busiest stations of JR Kyushu.

References

External links
JR Kyushu
Matsuura Railway (Japanese)
Ekimachi Ichōme Sasebo (Japanese)
Sasebo Gobangai (Japanese)
 

Railway stations in Japan opened in 1898
Railway stations in Nagasaki Prefecture
Sasebo Line
Sasebo